Park Jung-Hae (born 21 April 1987), is a South Korean football defender.

Park previously played for Sagan Tosu in the J2 League.

He was expelled from K-League after being implicated in the match-fixing scandal.

Club statistics

References

External links

1987 births
Living people
Association football defenders
South Korean footballers
South Korean expatriate footballers
Sagan Tosu players
Daejeon Hana Citizen FC players
J2 League players
K League 1 players
Expatriate footballers in Japan
South Korean expatriate sportspeople in Japan
Sportspeople from Busan